Kittiraj Sanor is a Thai footballer. He played for Thai Premier League clubside Sisaket, and is currently a free agent.

References

External links
Profile at Thaipremierleague.co.th

Living people
Kittiraj Sanor
1987 births
Kittiraj Sanor
Kittiraj Sanor
Association football midfielders